Roger P. Weissberg (1951—September 5, 2021) was a researcher in the field of psychology. He was the NoVo Foundation Endowed Chair in Social and Emotional Learning and LAS/UIC Distinguished Professor of Psychology & Education at University of Illinois at Chicago. He was the chief knowledge officer and board vice chair of the Collaborative for Academic, Social, and Emotional Learning (CASEL). He held a PhD in psychology from the University of Rochester and graduated summa cum laude with a BA in psychology from Brandeis University.

Major publications 
Books
Schneider, B. H., Attili, G., Nadel, J., & Weissberg, R. P. (Eds.). (1989). Social competence in developmental perspective. Boston: Kluwer Academic Publishers.
Weissberg, R. P., Gullotta, T. P., Hampton, R. L., Ryan, R. A., & Adams, G. R. (Eds.). (1997). Healthy children 2010: Enhancing children's wellness. Thousand Oaks, CA: Sage.
Elias, M. J., Zins, J. E., Weissberg, R. P., Frey, K. S., Greenberg, M. T., Haynes, N. M., Kessler, R., Schwab-Stone, M. E., & Shriver, T. P. (1997). Promoting social and emotional learning: Guidelines for educators. Alexandria, VA: Association for Supervision and Curriculum Development. 
Cicchetti, D., Rappaport, J., Sandler, I. N., & Weissberg, R. P. (Eds.). (2000).  The promotion of wellness in children and adolescents. Washington, DC: Child Welfare League of America Press.
Collaborative for Academic, Social, and Emotional Learning. (2003). Safe and sound: An educational leader's guide to evidence-based social and emotional learning programs. Chicago, IL: Author.
Weissberg, R. P., Walberg, H. J., O’Brien, M. U., & Kuster, C. B. (Eds.).  (2003). Long-term trends in the well-being of children and youth.  Washington, DC: Child Welfare League of America Press.
Weissberg, R. P., & Kumpfer, K. (Eds.). (2003). Special Issue:  Prevention that works for children and youth.  American Psychologist, 58, 425–490.
Zins, J. E., Weissberg, R. P., Wang, M. C., & Walberg. H. J. (Eds.). (2004). Building academic success on social and emotional learning: What does the research say?  New York:  Teachers College Press.
Patrikakou, E. N., Weissberg, R. P., Redding, S., & Walberg, H. J. (Eds.).  (2005). School-family partnerships for children's success. New York: Teachers College Press.
Devaney, E., O’Brien, M. U., Resnik, H., Keister, S., & Weissberg, R. P. (2006). Sustainable schoolwide social and emotional learning: Implementation guide and toolkit. Chicago, IL: Collaborative for Academic, Social, and Emotional Learning.
Durlak, J. A., Domitrovich, C. E., Weissberg, R. P., & Gullotta, T. P. (Eds.). (2015). Handbook of social and emotional learning: Research and practice. New York: Guilford.

Journal articles and book chapters

 Mahoney, J. L., Weissberg, R. P., Greenberg, M. T., Dusenbury, L., Jagers, R. J., Niemi, K., Schlinger, M., Schlund, J., Shriver, T. P., VanAusdal, K., & Yoder, N. (2020). Systemic social and emotional learning: Promoting educational success for all preschool to high school students. American Psychologist.
 Shriver, T. P., & Weissberg, R. P. (2020). A response to constructive criticism of social and emotional learning. Phi Delta Kappan, 101(7), 52–57.
 Weissberg, R. P. (2019). Promoting the social and emotional learning of millions of school children.  Perspectives on Psychological Science, 14(1), 65–69.
 Weissberg, R. P. (2017). Social and emotional learning: It's time for more international collaboration.  In E. Frydenberg, A. J. Martin, & R. J. Collie (Eds).  Social and emotional learning in Australia and the Asia Pacific (pp. v-ix).  Singapore:  Springer.
 Taylor, R. D., Oberle, E., Durlak, J. A. & Weissberg, R. P. (2017).  Promoting positive youth development through school-based social and emotional learning interventions: A meta-analysis of follow-up effects. Child Development, 88(4), 1156–1171. doi: 10.1111/cdev.12864.
 Osher, D., Kidron, Y., Brackett, M., Dymnicki, A., Jones, S., & Weissberg, R. P. (2016). Advancing the science and practice of social and emotional learning: Looking back and moving forward. Review of Research in Education, 40, 644–681. doi: 10.3102/0091732X16673595.
 Weissberg, R. P. (2015). Education to promote all students’ social, emotional, and academic competence.  In Feuer, M. J., Berman, A. I., & Atkinson, R. C. (Eds.).  Past as prologue: The National Academy of Education at 50: Members reflect (pp. 185–191).  Washington, DC:  National Academy of Education.
 Weissberg, R. P., Durlak, J. A., Domitrovich, C. E., & Gullotta, T. P. (2015). Social and emotional learning:  Past, present, and future.   In J. A. Durlak, C. E. Domitrovich, R. P. Weissberg, & T. P. Gullotta (Eds.), Handbook of social and emotional learning: Research and practice (pp. 3-19). New York: Guilford.
 Weissberg, R. P., & Cascarino, J. (2013, October). Academic learning + social-emotional learning = national priority. Phi Delta Kappan, 95(2), 8–13.
 Durlak, J. A., Weissberg, R. P., Dymnicki, A. B., Taylor, R. D., & Schellinger, K. (2011). The impact of enhancing students’ social and emotional learning: A meta-analysis of school-based universal interventions. Child Development, 82, 405–432.

References

University of Illinois Chicago faculty
21st-century American psychologists
University of Rochester alumni
Brandeis University alumni
1951 births
2021 deaths